is a passenger railway station located in the city of Hitachi, Ibaraki Prefecture, Japan operated by the East Japan Railway Company (JR East).

Lines
Ogitsu Station is served by the Jōban Line, and is located 152.4 km from the official starting point of the line at Nippori Station.

Station layout
The station is an elevated station with a single island platform. The station is staffed.

Platforms

History
Ogitsu Station was opened on 16 December 1909. The current station building was completed in 1982. The station was absorbed into the JR East network upon the privatization of the Japanese National Railways (JNR) on 1 April 1987.

Passenger statistics
In fiscal 2019, the station was used by an average of 2504 passengers daily (boarding passengers only).

Surrounding area
 Hitachi Metals Hidaka plant
Hitachi City Hall Hidaka branch office

See also
 List of railway stations in Japan

References

External links

 Station information JR East Station Information 

Railway stations in Ibaraki Prefecture
Jōban Line
Railway stations in Japan opened in 1909
Hitachi, Ibaraki